In Ohio, State Route 326 may refer to:
Ohio State Route 326 (1930s), a former state highway in Lucas County
Ohio State Route 326 (1930s-1960s), a former state highway in Marietta, Washington County